N3krozoft Ltd , previously N3krozoft Mord or N3kr0z0ft, is a transnational electronic art group founded in the early 1990s. The group has experimented with the intersection of technology, information and arts, exploiting the creative potential of, what was then, the new media technologies of CD-ROM, multimedia, live audiovisual jamming, and computer-generated video installations.

 Their work has been exhibited widely in international festivals, such as Viper (Basel, 2003), April Meetings (Belgrade, 2004), read_me festival (Aarhus, 2004), Bucharest Biennale (Bucharest, 2006), Art+Communication 8 (Riga, 2006) , Sónar (Barcelona, 2008).

The group's name is a coinage that combines "necro-" with "Microsoft", thus linking information technology with death, the particular spelling relating both to l33t hacker-slang and kabbalistic numerology.

Selected discography
 10 Gigabit Ethernet Alliance (f0rkb0mb, 2003)
 T.A.T.Y. - The Remixes (f0rkb0mb, 2004)
 Dunkelziffer (Blutgift, 2004)
 Signal Processing Primitives (f0rkb0mb, 2005)
 Unequal Error Protection (f0rkb0mb, 2005)
 DoS Attack Blues (7-bit recs, 2006)

References

Further reading

External links

signal wiki on JamST 
N3krozoft Ltd on last.fm
Collection of N3krozoft Ltd video productions on YouTube

International artist groups and collectives
Digital artists
New media artists